Chaka  is a 2000 Indian Bengali-language film directed by Nepal Dev Bhattacharya, starring Mithun Chakraborty supported by Debashree Roy, Paran Bandyopadhyay and Alaka Gangopadhyay.

Plot

Chaka  is a revenge story.

Cast

Mithun Chakraborty
Debashree Roy
Paran Bandyopadhyay
Alaka Gangopadhyay

References

External links
 

Bengali-language Indian films
2000 films
2000s Bengali-language films